10,000 Women is a program organized by Goldman Sachs and the Goldman Sachs Foundation with the goal of helping to grow local economies by providing business education, mentoring and networking, and access to capital to underserved women entrepreneurs globally. The program was announced on March 5, 2008, at Columbia University. The initiative is one of the largest philanthropic projects the bank has been involved with. The program was in its initial years run by Dina Habib Powell, a managing director at Goldman Sachs.

The program was continuing in 2022; Goldman Sachs published a report on the impact of the COVID-19 pandemic on female entrepreneursfrom the viewpoint of the  10,000 Women program.

Award process
As part of the program, Goldman Sachs committed US$100 million in funding and partnered universities in Europe and the United States with business schools in developing and emerging economies.

Vital Voices presented the 10,000 Women Entrepreneurial Achievement Award at its annual Global Leadership Awards event from 2009 to 2011. The award was given to a graduate of the 10,000 Women program, sponsored by Goldman Sachs. Past recipients include Temituokpe Esisi of Nigeria (2009), Andeisha Farid of Afghanistan (2010) and Fatema Akbari of Afghanistan (2011).

In September 2013, Goldman Sachs launched a public Twitter presence for the 10,000 Women program using the screen name @GS10KWomen. In December 2015 the account had over 39,000 followers.

Women Entrepreneurs Opportunity Facility
In March 2014, the World Bank’s International Finance Corporation and Goldman Sachs 10,000 Women program launched a $600 million financing program called the Women Entrepreneurs Opportunity Facility to allow 100,000 women entrepreneurs in emerging markets to have access to financing. IFC invested an initial $100 million in the program, and Goldman Sachs Foundation provided $32 million, with an additional $486 million expected from public and private investors.

Academic partners

See also
10,000 Small Businesses

References

External links
 10,000 Women

Goldman Sachs